Ulf Thors (born 14 June 1952) is a former ice hockey player and coach who played for Modo Hockey in the 1970s. He won the Elitserien playoffs and became Swedish champion with Modo in 1979. He later became head coach for Modo in 1989.

Career statistics

External links

1952 births
Living people
Modo Hockey players
Swedish ice hockey centres